is a former Japanese football player.

Club career
Yamazaki was born in Shizuoka on October 19, 1978. After graduating from Shimizu Higashi High School, he joined Nagoya Grampus Eight in 1997. He also entered in Chukyo University. However he had no opportunity to play at Grampus. He left Grampus and joined Chukyo University team in 1999. After graduating from the university, he joined his local club Shimizu S-Pulse in 2001. He moved to J2 League club Ventforet Kofu in 2003. The club was promoted to J1 League in 2006. He retired end of 2007 season.

National team career
In August 1995, Yamazaki was selected Japan U-17 national team for 1995 U-17 World Championship. He played all 3 matches and scored a goal against United States.

Club statistics

References

External links

jsgoal

1978 births
Living people
Chukyo University alumni
Association football people from Shizuoka Prefecture
Japanese footballers
Japan youth international footballers
J1 League players
J2 League players
Nagoya Grampus players
Shimizu S-Pulse players
Ventforet Kofu players
Association football forwards